Zenel Gavazaj (born 2 May 2000) is an Kosovo Albanian professional footballer who plays as a right winger for Albanian club Kukësi. He is the younger brother of Albania national team footballer Enis Gavazaj.

References

External links
 
 

2000 births
Living people
People from Prizren
Kosovo Albanians
Albanian footballers
Kosovan footballers
Association football wingers
Albania youth international footballers
Albania international footballers
KF Liria players
KF Skënderbeu Korçë players
FK Kukësi players
Kategoria Superiore players
Kosovan expatriate footballers
Expatriate footballers in Albania
Kosovan expatriate sportspeople in Albania